Arkadiusz Malarz (born 19 June 1980 in Pułtusk) is a Polish former footballer who played as a goalkeeper. He currently serves as an goalkeeping coach for Legia Warsaw.

Playing for his former club, Skoda Xanthi, he kept clean sheets in seven consecutive games, finally conceding a goal after 683 minutes, which is his former team's record for the longest "clean sheet" period in the Greek Super league.

Honours

Club
GKS Bełchatów
 I liga: 2013–14

Legia Warsaw
 Ekstraklasa: 2015–16, 2016–17, 2017–18
 Polish Cup: 2015–16

Individual
Greek Best Goalkeeper: 2006–07
Ekstraklasa Goalkeeper of the Year: 2017-18

References

External links
 

1980 births
Living people
People from Pułtusk
Sportspeople from Masovian Voivodeship
Polish footballers
Polish expatriate footballers
Association football goalkeepers
Polonia Warsaw players
Gwardia Warsaw players
Świt Nowy Dwór Mazowiecki players
Amica Wronki players
Lech Poznań players
Xanthi F.C. players
Panathinaikos F.C. players
OFI Crete F.C. players
Athlitiki Enosi Larissa F.C. players
AEL Limassol players
Panachaiki F.C. players
Ethnikos Achna FC players
GKS Bełchatów players
Legia Warsaw players
ŁKS Łódź players
Ekstraklasa players
Super League Greece players
Cypriot First Division players
Expatriate footballers in Greece
Expatriate footballers in Cyprus
Polish expatriate sportspeople in Greece
Polish expatriate sportspeople in Cyprus